Custom House, Yangon is a colonial-era landmark in Yangon, Myanmar (formerly Rangoon, Burma), designated in the Yangon City Heritage List. The building, located on Strand Road, facing the port area and its wharfs, continues to house the Burmese custom house.

Custom House was designed by Scottish architect John Begg, and built between 1912 and 1916. The building replaced a wooden customs house first constructed in 1853, following the end of the Second Anglo-Burmese War. Throughout the colonial era, the Customs House collected duties and excise taxes from commercial shipping, which represented an important revenue source for the colonial government.

The red brick building is noted for its towering bracket clock and columned portico, with architectural adaptations to tropical weather conditions.

References

External links

Government buildings in Myanmar
Buildings and structures in Yangon
Buildings and structures completed in 1916